Louise Plummer is an author of young adult fiction and a retired associate professor of English for Brigham Young University. She lives in New York, New York with her writer/professor husband Tom. Together they have four sons.

The Plummers moved from Boston to Minnesota in 1971 when Tom took a position at the University of Minnesota. While there, Louise earned a master's degree in English. They both took positions at BYU in 1985, the same year her first novel, The Romantic Obsessions and Humiliations of Annie Sehlmeier, received the Delacorte Press First Young Adult Novel Contest, leading to its publication. The book later became a children's choice book with both the New York Public Library and the International Reading Association.

Awards received by subsequent books include Her second novel, ALA Best Book, a School Library Journal Best Book, Utah Arts Council Best Young Adult Novel, Association for Mormon Letters Best Young Adult Novel, and another New York Public Library Children's Choice Book for her second novel, My Name is Sus5an Smith. The 5 is Silent. The Unlikely Romance of Kate Bjorkman was also an ALA Best Book, a School Library Journal Best Book, an Association for Mormon Letters Best Young Adult Novel. Her A Dance For Three was also an ALA Best Book.

Plummer is a member of The Church of Jesus Christ of Latter-day Saints. She has also written nonfiction books specifically for the Mormon audience and is a popular the Church of Jesus Christ of Latter-day Saints lecturer.

She is currently a weekly contributor to The Apron Stage.

Books 
 The Romantic Obsessions and Humiliations of Annie Sehlmeier (1987)
 My Name Is Sus5an Smith, the 5 Is Silent (1991)
 Thoughts of a Grasshopper: Essays and Oddities (1992)
 The Unlikely Romance of Kate Bjorkman (1995)
 Eating Chocolates and Dancing in the Kitchen: sketches of marriage and family (Introduction) (1998)
 Quiero Escribir Una Historia de Amor (1999)
 A Dance for Three (2000)
 Finding Daddy (2007)

References

External links 
 "Very Easy, Very Vogue," speech given by Louise Plummer
 "The Zen of Alzheimers", online essay by Louise Plummer

1942 births
20th-century American novelists
21st-century American novelists
American women novelists
Latter Day Saints from New York (state)
Brigham Young University faculty
Novelists from Utah
American academics of English literature
Living people
20th-century American women writers
21st-century American women writers
University of Minnesota College of Liberal Arts alumni
American women non-fiction writers
21st-century American non-fiction writers
Latter Day Saints from Minnesota
Latter Day Saints from Utah